Durgan Dham Temple or Durgan Mandir is a Goddess Durga Mata temple located at Lugri, Rohnsi Bujurg, Gauriganj, Amethi district in Uttar Pradesh, India. A big fair is organized here every Monday or Friday along with Chaitra Navratri and Kuwar Navratri of Maa Durga Bhavani Dham, while lakhs of devotees from far and wide come here for the darshan and blessings of Maa Bhavani, people believe that by coming here, Maa Bhavani. Siddha Peeth Durgan Dham, located at a distance of 5 km from the city of Gauriganj, is a holy pilgrimage site of mythological Hindu religion, here the idols found in ancient times in the temple courtyard provide a great amount of authenticity to the fact. In Navratri, there is a crowd of devotees of the mother, as well as every Monday, the crowd in the form of a fair comes to see the mother, the lake located behind the temple, and the beautiful lotus flowers blooming in it attract people. A huge crowd gathers here on the occasion of Chaitra Navratri and Shardiya Navratri. This temple is being considered to be renovated.

Notable visitors, including Rahul Gandhi, Smriti Irani, come to Durgan Dham Temple.

Transportation 
Chaudhary Charan Singh Airport, Lucknow is the nearest airport to reach Durgan Dham Temple. Private taxis are available from travel, auto-rickshaws, cycle rickshaws and Tempos are also readily available.

See also
 Nandmahar Dham
 Lodi Baba Mandir
 Mata Mawai Dham
 Ulta Gadha Dham

References

External links

Hindu temples in Uttar Pradesh